Krista Knudsen (born December 28, 1979) is an American politician serving in the Minnesota House of Representatives since 2023. A member of the Republican Party of Minnesota, Knudsen represents District 5A in northern Minnesota, which includes the city of Park Rapids and parts of Becker, Cass, Hubbard and Wadena Counties.

Early life, education and career 
Knudsen attended college at Minnesota State University, Mankato, earning a bachelor's degree in social work and alcohol and drug studies.

Knudsen served on the Lake Shore City Council for eight years before becoming mayor in 2020.

Minnesota House of Representatives 
Knudsen was elected to the Minnesota House of Representatives in 2022, after redistricting and the retirement of Republican incumbent John Poston. She serves on the Education Finance and Education Policy Committees.

Electoral history

Personal life 
Knudsen lives in Lake Shore, Minnesota with her husband, Kevin, and four children.

References

External links 

Republican Party members of the Minnesota House of Representatives
1979 births
Living people